Kim Berfield (born May 29, 1971) is a former Republican member of the Florida House of Representatives representing the 50th district from 2000 to 2006. She ran for the Florida Senate in 2006, but lost to Charlie Justice. In June 2021, she announced that she was running for the Florida House of Representatives in 2022. She was elected to the State House again in November 2022.

References

External links
Project Vote Smart – Representative Kim Berfield (FL) profile
Our Campaigns – Kim Berfield (FL) profile
Florida House of Representatives - Kim Berfield

Living people
University of Central Florida alumni
St. Petersburg College alumni
1971 births
Republican Party members of the Florida House of Representatives
Women state legislators in Florida
21st-century American women politicians
21st-century American politicians
20th-century American women politicians
20th-century American politicians